Stanley Noel Galloway (July 1, 1915 – October 14, 2000) was an American football coach.  He served as the seventh head football coach at Southeastern Louisiana University in Hammond, Louisiana and he held that position for 14 seasons, from 1951 until 1964.  His coaching record at Southeastern Louisiana was 84–42–4.

Galloway launched his football coaching career at Donaldsonville High in 1939 after turning down an offer from Mt. Hermon High, which didn't have a football team, because the people wanted it to be a year-round job—including going to church on Sundays.

"I go to church," Galloway told them when he turned down the job, "but I don't sing in the choir."

He moved to Hammond in 1941 and Bogalusa a year later, leading Lumberjacks to a 12–0 season in 1947 capped by a 27–6 victory over Lake Charles in the Class AA state finals.

Bolton High of Alexandria was his next stop, but he didn't stay there long enough to coach a football game. He moved to Bolton in the spring of 1951 and took the head coaching position at Southeastern (his alma mater) before 1951 season rolled around.

In 14 years at Southeastern, his teams won or shared the Gulf State Conference championship six times—including four of his first six seasons—and finished second five times.

Galloway was selected by the United States Air Force to lecture at Air Force football clinics in Wiesbaden, Germany in 1962 and in the South Pacific in 1963.

After he retired from coaching, Galloway applied the same philosophy and organizational skills to his job as the first Commissioner of State Colleges and Universities under the jurisdiction of the Louisiana State Board of Education—a position he held from 1965 to 1973.

Under his direction, the Board doubled the coaching staffs of all state colleges and universities, doubled the number of scholarships allowed, initiated a building program for athletic facilities at state schools, made membership in the NCAA mandatory and made the position of sports information director mandatory at each school.

“We tried to get everyone on the same level,” he said later. “But we may have done too much. With the taste of success and the increased coaching staffs, some people had even bigger ideas. Louisiana Tech and Southwestern Louisiana, especially, wanted to do more.”

After Tech and USL pulled out of the conference, the league folded.

From 1973 through 1979, Galloway served as the first commissioner of the Gulf South Conference.

He is a member of the Southeastern Louisiana University Hall of Fame, and was inducted into the Louisiana High School Coaches Association Hall of Fame in 1984. In 1989, he was inducted into the Louisiana Sports Hall of Fame.

Head coaching record

College

References

External links
 

1915 births
2000 deaths
Gulf South Conference commissioners
Southeastern Louisiana Lions football coaches
High school football coaches in Louisiana